Govind Singh Dotasra (born 1 October 1964) is the president of Rajasthan Pradesh Congress Committee. He was appointed Minister of State for primary and secondary education (Independent Charge), Tourism and Devasthan in 2018 Government of Rajasthan. Later on 20th November 2021 he resigned from his ministry post respecting Party's one man one post policy. He is a member of 15th Rajasthan Legislative Assembly and a former chief whip of the Indian National Congress party in that Assembly. He is representing the Laxmangarh constituency of Sikar district of Rajasthan since 2008 and has been a member of the INC since 1981.

Dotasra was appointed chairman of media and communication committee ahead of 2018 Rajasthan polls on 5 October 2018. He served as vice president of Rajasthan Pradesh Congress Committee from 2014 to 2020 and president of District Congress Committee, Sikar, for 7 years (July 2011 to May 2018).

Rajasthan Legislative Assembly results

Early life and education 
Govind Singh Dotasra was born to Mohan Singh Dotasra and Rupi Devi on 1 October 1964 in the village of Kripa Ram Ji ki Dhani, Sutod, Laxmangarh in Sikar District of Rajasthan. His father was a government teacher. His schooling took place in the native village and after that, he did B.Com., B.Ed. and LL.B. degrees at the University of Rajasthan. On 4 March 1984, he married Sunita Devi, a teacher. They have two sons. After graduation, he started practicing law in the Sikar Court.

Political career 
Dotasra was elected as Pradhan of the Laxmangarh Panchayat Samiti in 2005.

In 2008, he contested the Rajasthan Legislative Assembly election for the first time and won the seat of Laxmangarh by a close margin of 34 votes against independent candidate Dinesh Joshi. 

He defeated former union minister of state and 3 time MP Subhash Maharia by a margin of 10,723 votes in the 2013 Rajasthan Legislative Assembly election. In this election his party Congress had lost 160+ seats in the state. He is also a member of Public Accounts Committee of Rajasthan Assembly 2015–16.

In the Assembly, Dotasra has in particular raised issues related to farmers and weaker sections of society.

He won the 2018 Rajasthan Legislative Assembly election - his third win of the Laxmangarh seat - with a margin of 22052 votes, which was the highest in Sikar district.

Other Activity
Dotasra represented Rajasthan Legislative Assembly in 24th Commonwealth Parliamentary Association (CPA) Seminar from 27 May – 1 June 2013 in Singapore. Dotasra participated in 16th and 17th All India Whips’ Conference in Goa and Visakhapatnam.

References

Rajasthan MLAs 2008–2013
People from Sikar district
Rajasthani politicians
Living people
1964 births
Indian National Congress politicians
Rajasthan MLAs 2013–2018
Rajasthan MLAs 2018–2023